The night raid on Narang was a night raid on a household in the village of Ghazi Khan in the early morning hours of December 27, 2009.  The operation was authorized by NATO and resulted in the death of ten Afghan civilians, most of whom were students, and some of whom were children. The status of the deceased was initially in dispute with NATO officials claiming the dead were Taliban members found with weapons and bomb making materials, while some Afghan government officials and local tribal authorities asserted they were civilians.

According to an Afghan initial investigation led by Mr. Assadullah Wafa, the raiding party took off by helicopter from Kabul.  The raiding party allegedly dragged the victims out of their beds and shot them in the head or chest. A survivor was subsequently interrogated and pictures were taken  of the dead bodies. Investigations later determined that most of the victims were aged between 12 and 18 years and were enrolled in local schools.

The Afghan government claimed U.S. Forces were involved, while statements by NATO asserted U.S. and NATO forces did not participate in the shootings. Afghan Defense Ministry spokesman Zaher Azimy said Afghan troops had not taken part in the operation. Who exactly carried out the raid and shot the victims remains unclear. In 2015 it became known that 
as part of the US covert Omega Program SEAL Team Six members in conjunction with C.I.A. paramilitary officers and Afghan troops trained by the C.I.A. carried out the assault.

Summary of events 
According to an Afghan investigation at around 1 am American troops with helicopters left Kabul and landed around 2 km away. They walked from the helicopters to the houses where they gathered the students from two rooms, into one room, and opened fire. Colonel Gross said that U.S. forces were present but did not lead the operation. A local elder, Jan Mohammed, said that three boys were killed in one room and five were handcuffed before they were shot. "I saw their school books covered in blood," he said.

Investigation 
President Hamid Karzai strongly condemned the military operation and tasked a delegation led by Assadullah Wafa to investigate the killings. The investigation found that all of the victims were civilians and that eight of them were students between the ages of 12 and  17. A preliminary investigation by the United Nations reinforced Afghan claims that most of the dead were schoolboys. Assadullah Wafa who led the investigation, said: "It’s impossible they were al-Qaeda. They were children, they were civilians, they were innocent." While a joint Afghan-NATO investigation is ongoing Hamid Karzai offered 100,000 afghanis to the victim's families. Amid calls for prosecution of the attackers by the Afghan Security Council Karzai conceded that he didn't know who the shooters were. Afghan Defense Ministry spokesman Zaher Azimy said Afghan troops had not taken part in the operation. NATO reiterated that the forces which conducted the attack were not under NATO command and were of a "non-military" nature.
NATO did, though, concede it authorized the operation and apologized for doing so, admitting the dead were likely civilians and that the intelligence on which the authorization was based was faulty.

Reactions

Afghanistan
Hundreds of Afghans rallied in the streets of Jalalabad and Kabul. Hundreds were university students and some were wearing blue headbands with the words: "Stop killing us!". They burned an effigy of U.S. President Barack Obama and chanted "Death to America" and "Obama! Obama! Take your soldiers out of Afghanistan!".

Safiullah Aminzai, a student organiser, told AFP: "Our demonstration is against those foreigners who have come to our country." "They have not brought democracy to Afghanistan but they are killing our religious scholars and children."

Relatives of the victims
Farooq Abul Ajan who lost two children, four nephews and two brothers in the operation complained to President Hamid Karzai that no one has taken responsibility. He said "We wanted to know who it was." The president’s spokesman, Waheed Omar, assured the relatives that the palace were “actively seeking” to bring the perpetrators to justice.

See also
Khataba raid
Granai airstrike
Azizabad airstrike
Uruzgan helicopter attack
Haska Meyna wedding party airstrike
List of massacres in Afghanistan

References

External links 
Video report US-Led Forces Accused of Executing Schoolchildren in Afghanistan on Democracy Now.

2009 in Afghanistan
War in Afghanistan (2001–2021) casualties
Civilian casualties in the War in Afghanistan (2001–2021)
Massacres in Afghanistan
Civilians in war
Mass murder in 2009
History of Kunar Province
December 2009 events in Asia